Joe Ely is an American singer, songwriter and guitarist. His discography consists of 18 studio albums, 5 live albums, 19 singles, 12 compilations, 1 EP, and 1 music video. In addition, he has been a performer on numerous albums by other artists.

Studio albums

Live albums

Compilations

EPs

Singles

Guest singles

Music videos

As a member of the Flatlanders
 1980: One Road More (Charly)
 1990: More A Legend Than A Band (Rounder) - initially released in 1976 as All American Music in a limited run on 8-track tape 
 1995: "Unplugged" (Sun) - recorded in March, 1972
 2002: Now Again (New West)
 2003: Wheels of Fortune (New West)
 2004: Live at the One Knite: June 8th 1972 (New West)
 2004: Live From Austin TX DVD (New West)
 2009: Hills And Valleys (New West)
 2012: The Odessa Tapes (New West) - unreleased 1972 recordings

As a member of Los Super Seven 
 1998: Los Super Seven (BMG / RCA)
 2001: Canto (Columbia)
 2005: Heard It On The X (Telarc)

As composer 
 1985: Lisa Rhodes - Shivers (Spindletop) - track 3, "I'll Be Your Fool"
 1988: Jimmie Dale Gilmore - Fair & Square (Hightone) - track 2, "Honky Tonk Masquerade"
 1988: Guy Clark - Old Friends (Sugar Hill) - track 7, "The Indian Cowboy"
 1988: Mack Abernathy - Different Situations (CMI) - track 10, "Honky Tonk Masquerade
 1991: Kelly Willis - Bang Bang (MCA) - track 10, "Settle For Love"
 1994: Townes Van Zandt - Roadsongs (Sugar Hill) - track 7, "The Indian Cowboy"
 1994: various artists - Howl... A Farewell Compilation Of Unreleased Songs (Glitterhouse) - track 4, "Honky Tonk Masquerade" (performed by Joe Henry)
 1998: Ramblin' Jack Elliott - Friends Of Mine (HighTone) - track 2, "Me & Billy The Kid"
 2010: John Train - All of Your Stories (Chapter 7) - track 8, "Because of the Wind"
 2010: Rod Taylor - Here, There, Or Anywhere (Broken Horn) - track 10, "The Indian Cowboy"
 2012: Pat Green - Songs We Wish We'd Written, Vol. 2 (Sugar Hill) - track 1, "All Just to Get to You" (co-written with Will Sexton)
 2014: Jason D. Williams - Hillbillies and Holy Rollers (MRI / Rock-A-Billy) - track 5, "Fingernails"

As primary artist/song contributor 
 1978: various artists - Kerrville Folk Festival 1978 (PSG) - track 2, "Livin' On A Dry Land Farm" (with Butch Hancock)
 1992: various artists - Buddy's Buddys: The Buddy Holly Songbook (Connoisseur Collection) - track 20, "Rock Me My Baby"
 1992: various artists - Across the Great Divide: Songs of Jo Carol Pierce (Deja Disc) - track 2, "Queen Of Heaven"
 1994: various artists - Brace Yourself! A Tribute To Otis Blackwell (Shanachie) - track 11, "Great Balls of Fire"
 1994: various artists - Tulare Dust : A Songwriter's Tribute to Merle Haggard (HighTone) - track 6, "White Line Fever"
 1995: various artists - For the Love of Harry: Everybody Sings Nilsson (MusicMasters) - track 5, "Joy"
 1995: various artists - Texans Live From Mountain Stage (Blue Plate) - track 9, "I Had My Hopes Up High"
 1996: various artists - Not Fade Away (Remembering Buddy Holly) (Decca / MCA) - track 8, "Oh Boy!" (with Todd Snider)
 2000: various artists -  KGSR Broadcasts Vol. 8 (KGSR) - track 2-1, "Dallas" (with the Flatlanders); track 3-3, "The Indian Cowboy"
 2001: various artists - Daddy-O Daddy! Rare Family Songs of Woody Guthrie (Rounder) - track 2, "Want To See Me Grow" and track 12, "Tippy Tap Toe" (both with Jimmie Dale Gilmore)
 2002: various artists -  KGSR Broadcasts Vol. 10 (KGSR) - track 2-1, "I Had My Hopes Up High" (with the Flatlanders)
 2003: various artists - Light Of Day: A Tribute to Bruce Springsteen (Schoolhouse) - track 2-18, "Working on the Highway"
 2003: various artists -  KGSR Broadcasts Vol. 11 (KGSR) - track 2-14, "Streets Of Sin"
 2006: various artists - A Case for Case: A Tribute to the Songs of Peter Case (Hungry For Music) - track 2-2, "Put Down The Gun"
 2006: various artists - Sail Away: The Songs Of Randy Newman (Sugar Hill) - track 4, "Rider In The Rain" (with Reckless Kelly)
 2009: various artists - Man of Somebody's Dreams: A Tribute to Chris Gaffney (Yep Roc) - track 1, "Lift Your Leg"
 2010: various artists -  KGSR Broadcasts Vol. 18 (KGSR) - track 1-4, "Midnight Train"
 2011: various artists - This One's for Him: A Tribute to Guy Clark (Icehouse) - track 2-1, "Dublin Blues"

Other appearances

1978 - 1989 
 1978: Terry Allen -  Lubbock (On Everything) (Fate) - harmonica
 1979: Butch Hancock - The Wind's Dominion (Rainlight) - resonator guitar
 1980: Terry Allen and the Panhandle Mystery Band - Smokin' the Dummy (Fate) - harmonica
 1982: The Clash - Combat Rock (CBS / Epic) - backing vocals
 1983: Terry Allen and the Panhandle Mystery Band - Bloodlines (Fate) - backing vocals
 1984: Robert Earl Keen - No Kinda Dancer (Philo) - steel guitar on track 4, "Swervin' In My Lane"
 1986: Darden Smith - Native Soil (Redi-Mix / Watermelon) - steel guitar on track 7, "Wild West Show"
 1988: Jimmie Dale Gilmore - Fair & Square (Hightone) - vocals
 1989: Butch Hancock - Own & Own (Demon / Sugar Hill) - guitar, backing vocals
 1989: Kimmie Rhodes - Angels Get The Blues (Heartland) - vocals
 1989: Syd Straw - Surprise (Virgin) - guest on track 12, "Learning The Game" (bonus track on 2000 reissue)

1990 - present 
 1993: Uncle Tupelo - Anodyne (Rhino / Sire) - guitar, vocal on track 15, "Are You Sure Hank Done It This Way" (bonus track)
 1996: Terry Allen - Human Remains (Sugar Hill) - backing vocals
 1997: Scotty Moore and D.J. Fontana - All The King's Men (Polydor) - track 5, "I'm Gonna Strangle You Shortly" (with Lee Rocker)
 1999: Aztex - Short Stories (HighTone) - special guest
 2003: The Chieftains - Further Down the Old Plank Road (Victor / Arista) - track 8, "The Moonshiner/I'm A Rambler"
 2004: Rosie Flores - Bandera Highway (HighTone / Shout!) - guest artist on track 4, "Love and Danger"
 2004: Tom Russell - Indians Cowboys Horses Dogs (HighTone) - lead vocal on track 6, "Lily, Rosemary and the Jack of Hearts"
 2005: Original Bells Of Joy - Original Bells Of Joy and Friends (Dialtone) - shared lead vocal on track 1, "Sinner Man"
 2005: James McMurtry - Childish Things (Lightning Rod / Compadre) - vocals on track 4, "Slew Foot"
 2015: Tom Russell - The Rose of Roscrae (Proper) - vocals
 2016: Robert Earl Keen - Live Dinner Reunion (Dualtone) - guitar, vocals on track 2-11, "The Road Goes On Forever"

Sources
 JoeEly.com  - Official home page
 
 

Country music discographies
Rock music discographies
Discographies of American artists
Folk music discographies